Cyrtonaias is a genus of freshwater mussels, aquatic bivalve mollusks in the family Unionidae.

References

Haag, W. R. (2012). North American Freshwater Mussels: Natural History, Ecology, and Conservation. Cambridge University Press. 

Unionidae
Bivalve genera